192TV is a non-stop music television channel that brings mainly music videos from the 1950s, 1960s and 1970s, the so-called Oldies. The channel was founded by Bert van Breda, René Kroon and Ad Bouman, and is owned by BR Music BV. The name is referring to  the defunct offshore pirate radio station Radio Veronica from the 1960s and 1970s that aired on wavelength 192 meters (1562 kHz). The channel is available as a cable channel. The channel is passed by most providers of digital television. 192TV launched through cable operator Caiway in the Netherlands on July 29, 2010.

The broadcasts of 192TV began in late August 2010. The name refers to the first transmission frequency on which Radio Veronica aired. The channel has a high retro character. Promotional videos are shown for singles from the time that the offshore radio station (still) existed, sometimes interspersed with later work.

On Saturday afternoon, music videos are shown using old Dutch Top 40.

References

External links 
 Official Website

Television channels in the Netherlands
Television channels and stations established in 2010